The 1923 U.S. Open was the 27th U.S. Open, held July 13–15 at Inwood Country Club in Inwood, New York, a suburb east of New York City on Long Island. Amateur golf legend Bobby Jones, age 21, captured his first career major championship, defeating Bobby Cruickshank by two strokes in an 18-hole Sunday playoff.

Qualifying directly preceded the tournament proper, which was held on Friday and Saturday, 36 holes per day, with no cut.

Jones held a three-stroke lead through 54 holes, but struggled throughout the final round on Saturday afternoon. He bogeyed the first, hit his tee shot out of bounds at the par-3 seventh for a double bogey, hit his second shot on 16 into the parking lot, and then added another bogey at 17. Still with the lead heading to the 18th, Jones made a double-bogey for a round of 76 (+4) and 296 (+8) total.

During the 18-hole playoff on Sunday, Jones and Cruickshank only halved three of the first 17 holes, but they were all square heading to the 18th.

This was the first of Jones' four U.S. Open titles, a record shared with three others: Willie Anderson, Ben Hogan, and Jack Nicklaus. It was also the first of four playoffs Jones was involved in, winning twice.

Course layout

Source:

Past champions in the field 

Source:

Round summaries

First round
Friday, July 13, 1923 (morning)

Source:

Second round
Friday, July 13, 1923 (afternoon)

Source:

Third round
Saturday, July 14, 1923 (morning)

Source:

Final round
Saturday, July 14, 1923 (afternoon)

Source:
(a) denotes amateur

Scorecard
Final round

Cumulative tournament scores, relative to par
Source:

Playoff 
Sunday, July 15, 1923

Source:

Scorecard

Source:

References

External links
USGA Championship Database
USOpen.com - 1923

U.S. Open (golf)
Golf in New York (state)
Sports in Long Island
U.S. Open
U.S. Open golf
U.S. Open golf
U.S. Open golf